Iris ser. Tripetalae is a series of the genus Iris, in Iris subg. Limniris.

The series was first classified by Ludwig Diels in 'Die Natürlichen Pflanzenfamilien' (Edited by H. G. A. Engler and K. Prantl) in 1930.
It was further expanded by George Hill Mathewson Lawrence in Gentes Herb (written in Dutch) in 1953.

The name of the series comes from the three petals of the flowers of the species in the series.

It has been theorised that due to that when the ice caps were formed in the last ice age, this split Iris tridentata from other forms in North America.

Most have small standards and violet-blue flowers, with darker veins on the large falls.

Only, Iris setosa is in cultivation, in the UK, and in the US.

They prefer lime-free soils and moist conditions. They are often used in hybridising with species of Iris ser. Sibiricae or Iris ser. Californicae.

Includes;
Iris hookeri Penny – Hooker's iris
Iris setosa Pallas ex Link – beachhead iris
Iris tridentata Pursh – savanna iris

References

External links

Tripetalae